The Standseilbahn Stuttgart or Stuttgart Cable Car is a funicular railway in the city of Stuttgart, Germany. The line links the Südheimer Platz valley station with the Stuttgart Degerloch forest cemetery in the south quarters of Heslach. At Südheimer Platz, the funicular connects to Stuttgart Stadtbahn lines U1 and U14.

Overview
The funicular has the following technical parameters:

Altitude difference: 
Maximum steepness: 28.3%
Journey time: 3 minutes
Capacity: 74 passengers per car
Traction: Cable-hauled, electric

The two cars, constructed of teak, were manufactured by Maschinenfabrik Esslingen. In December 1999, one of the cars was damaged by an uprooted tree as a result of a thunderstorm, but was afterwards restored. The line was modernized in 2004 in order to meet the new European Union safety guidelines for cable cars after the Kaprun disaster. Since 24 July 2004, it is again running on schedule.

The line is one of two active transport tourist attractions in Stuttgart, the other being the Stuttgart Rack Railway (line 10).

The line sometimes is referred to as 'Erbschleicherexpress' which translates as legacy hunter express.

See also 

 List of funicular railways

References 
Specific

General

 Hans-Joachim Knupfer: Hoch über Heslach - Die Stuttgarter Seilbahn. 75 Jahre Technik- und Verkehrsgeschichte. Stuttgarter Straßenbahnen AG, Stuttgart 2004, 
 G. Bauer, U. Theurer, C. Jeanmaire: Stuttgarter Straßenbahnen. Eine Dokumentation über die Straßenbahnlinien von 1868 - 1975. Verlag Eisenbahn Gut Vorhard, Villigen AG 1976, page 232
 Gottfried Bauer, Ulrich Theurer: Von der Straßenbahn zur Stadtbahn Stuttgart 1975-2000. Eine Dokumentation über den Schienenverkehr der Stuttgarter Straßenbahnen AG (SSB) zwischen 1975 und 2000. Stuttgarter Straßenbahnen AG, Stuttgart 2000, pages 167,204-205

External links 

 Standseilbahn Stuttgart at trampicturebook.de
 Description of the heslach round walk which incorporates a ride with the Standseilbahn Stuttgart

Transport in Stuttgart
Railway lines in Baden-Württemberg
Stuttgart, Standseilbahn
Metre gauge railways in Germany
Railway lines opened in 1929